Anne-Laure Casseleux (born 13 January 1984) is a French former football player who last played for the French club Juvisy of the Division 1 Féminine. She is a former graduate of the women's section of the Clairefontaine academy and plays as a defender. After Clairefontaine, Casseleux joined Soyaux and had two seasons therebefore joining Juvisy in 2005. Her form at Soyaux also led to her being called up to the France women's team. Casseleux made her national team debut on 14 September 2003 in a friendly match against Japan.

As an under-19 international, she won the 2003 U-19 European Championship.

References

External links
 
 
 
 

1984 births
Living people
People from Tarare
French women's footballers
Olympique Lyonnais Féminin players
CNFE Clairefontaine players
ASJ Soyaux-Charente players
Paris FC (women) players
France women's international footballers
2003 FIFA Women's World Cup players
Women's association football defenders
Division 1 Féminine players
Sportspeople from Rhône (department)
Footballers from Auvergne-Rhône-Alpes
France women's youth international footballers